Gerhard Eck  (born January 24, 1960 in Schweinfurt)  is a German politician, representative of the Christian Social Union of Bavaria.

Political career
Eck is a member of the Landtag of Bavaria. Since 2013, he has been State Secretary at the State Ministry of the Interior in the governments of successive Ministers-President Horst Seehofer (2013-2018) and Markus Söder (since 2018). He is one of his state's representatives at the Bundesrat.

Other activities
 Federal Network Agency for Electricity, Gas, Telecommunications, Post and Railway (BNetzA), Member of the Rail Infrastructure Advisory Council
 Nuremberg Airport, Ex-Officio Member of the Supervisory Board (since 2017)
 BayernLB, Member of the Supervisory Board (-2013)

See also
List of Bavarian Christian Social Union politicians

References

Christian Social Union in Bavaria politicians
1960 births
Living people
People from Schweinfurt